Barbalissos was a city in the Roman province of Euphratensis. Its site is marked by the ruins at Qala'at Balis, which partly retains the old name, south of Maskanah (the ancient Emar), in modern Syria, on the road from Aleppo to the site of Sura, where the Euphrates turns suddenly to the east.

History

The city, built near the ruined site of ancient Emar, which had fallen in 1187 BC. During the Roman Empire served as the base of the Equites Dalmatae Illyriciani, a Roman cavalry unit which probably had its origins in the Balkans.

In 253 it was the site of the Battle of Barbalissos in which the Sassanid Persians under Shapur I defeated a Roman army. Shapur proceeded to sack and burn all the major towns and cities of Syria Coele such as Antioch, Zeugma and Samosata.

The Byzantine Emperor Justinian (527–565) rebuilt its walls.

The Arabic version of the list of the bishops at the First Council of Nicaea in 325 includes an Antonius of Barbalissus. Sources in Greek mention a Bishop Aquilinus of Barbalissus, who, at the time of the Council of Ephesus (431), was a partisan of Nestorius and was for that reason exiled from the bishopric; and Theodoret of Cyrus speaks of a Bishop Marinianus of Barbalissus, who may have been the replacement for Barbalissus, as having been imposed by force.

Although Lequien wrote that no Notitia Episcopatuum mentioned Barbalissus, which he suggested was a small fortified town rather than a city, an early 20th-century writer says the diocese is included in one such list, dating from the 6th century, as a suffragan of Hierapolis Bambyce, within the patriarchate of Antioch. It appears in no later Notitia Episcopatuum, apparently because at some unclear date it passed into the possession of the Jacobite Church. The Chronicle of Michael the Syrian gives the names of five Jacobite Bishops of Bales or Beit Bales (the Syriac equivalent of Barbalissus): John, Habib, Basil, Timothy, and Elias.

No longer a residential diocese, the bishopric of Barbalissus is today listed by the Catholic Church as a titular see.

References

Roman towns and cities in Syria
Archaeological sites in Aleppo Governorate
Barbalissus